Little Deuce Coupe is the fourth album by the American rock band the Beach Boys, released October 7, 1963 on Capitol Records. It reached number 4 in the US during a chart stay of 46 weeks, and was eventually certified platinum by the RIAA. It is considered to be one of the earliest examples of a rock concept album.

The album was released three weeks after Surfer Girl. Four of the tracks from Little Deuce Coupe ("409", "Shut Down", "Little Deuce Coupe", and "Our Car Club") had already appeared on previous albums, and discounting an alternate recording of "Be True to Your School", no tracks from the album were issued as an A-sided single.

Production
As with the preceding Surfer Girl album, the date assigned for recording all eight of the new tracks (September 2, 1963) is highly doubtful. However, as no AFM contracts from these sessions are known to exist, the actual dates are currently unknown.

Although Nick Venet was listed as producer for "Shut Down" and Murry Wilson for "409", the official producer's credit for the entire Little Deuce Coupe album cites only Brian Wilson. Despite the rushed nature of the album's sessions, Wilson's song arrangements were notably becoming more complex, specifically songs like "No-Go Showboat" and "Custom Machine". This was the last Beach Boys album to officially include rhythm guitarist David Marks until 2012's That's Why God Made the Radio.

After the album's recording, Wilson re-recorded "Be True to Your School" for single release on October 28, resulting in another top 10 hit. An original Christmas-themed composition, "Little Saint Nick" was also recorded that month and issued as a Christmas single.

Title and cover art

A Deuce Coupe is a 1932 Ford Coupe (deuce being for the year). This was considered by many to be the definitive "hot rod".  The Model B had four cylinders and the Model 18 featured the Ford flathead V8 engine when the car was introduced.  A pink slip (mentioned in the lyrics) was the title to the car, named for the color of the paper then used in California.

The picture featured on the front cover of the album was supplied by Hot Rod magazine, and features the body (with his head cropped in the photo) of hot-rod owner Clarence 'Chili' Catallo and his own customized three-window 1932 Ford Coupe – known to hot rod enthusiasts as "the lil' deuce coupe".

Track listing

Notes
 Some reissues of the album omit "Car Crazy Cutie" and "Custom Machine".
 Because "409" was only available in mono, a Duophonic (fake stereo) mix was used on the otherwise true stereo version of the album. Both stereo and mono mixes are available on the 2012 CD.
 Mike Love was not originally credited for "Be True to Your School", "409", "Don't Back Down", and "Custom Machine". His credits were awarded after a 1994 court case.

References

External links

New York Times article (11-14-09) on the hot rod on the album cover

The Beach Boys albums
Concept albums
1963 albums
Rock-and-roll albums
Capitol Records albums
Albums produced by Brian Wilson
Albums recorded at United Western Recorders